The Tiense Vechter, is a criticallyendangered Belgian breed of gamecock. It dates from the late nineteenth century, and was bred specifically for cock-fighting. It named for its area of origin, that around the city of Tienen in Flemish Brabant, in eastern central Belgium. It is one of three Belgian breeds of fighting-cock, the others being the Brugse Vechter and the Luikse Vechter.

History

The Tiense Vechter derives from the oldest of the three Belgian fighting-cock breeds, the Brugse Vechter, which originated in western Flanders in the early years of the nineteenth century and was formerly common throughout Belgium. In the later part of that century, in the area of Liège, in Wallonia in eastern central Belgium, efforts were made to improve the fighting capabilities of the Brugse Vechter by cross-breeding with fighting birds of Oriental origin, which gave rise to the Luikse Vechter. The Tiense Vechter was created in much the same way, in the provinces of Brabant, Liège and Limburg, and mainly in the area of Tienen in  Flemish Brabant.

The Tiense Vechter is critically endangered. It is the most threatened of the three Belgian gamecock breeds. In 2010 there were 33 birds, all in Flanders. 

A bantam Tiense Vechter was bred in the second part of the twentieth century. The plumage colours are superior to those of the full-sized breed. Like the full-sized bird, it is critically endangered.

Characteristics

The Tiense Vechter is a large and powerful bird. Like the Luikse Vechter and unlike the Brugse Vechter, it has a steeply inclined back-line. Unlike both the other fighting breeds, it has no dark pigmentation of the face, skin and legs, which are all pale. The comb is triple, and the wattles are rudimentary or completely absent. In addition to the seventeen plumage colours recognised for the Brugse Vechter, there are four others, including cuckoo, which is the pattern most commonly seen.

Use

The Tiense Vechter was bred for its fighting ability. Cock-fighting is against the law in Belgium, and practitioners of the sport usually travel to northern France. Some strains are reared only for exhibition at poultry shows.

References

Further reading

 J.-M. Larivière, J. Detilleux, P. Leroy (2011). Estimates of inbreeding rates in forty traditional Belgian chicken breeds populations = Schätzung des Inzuchtgrades bei vierzig einheimischen Belgischen Hühnerrassen. Archiv für Geflügelkunde 75 ( 1): 1- 6.

Chicken breeds
Chicken breeds originating in Belgium